Following is a list of current and former courthouses of the United States federal court system located in Georgia. Each entry indicates the name of the building along with an image, if available, its location, and the dates during which it was used for each such jurisdiction, and, if applicable the person for whom it was named, and the date of renaming. In the late 1800s to the middle 1900s, it was common for federal courthouses to double as United States Post Offices.

Lists of courthouses

Key

See also
List of county courthouses in Georgia (U.S. state)

References

External links

U.S. Marshals Service Middle District of Georgia Courthouse Locations
U.S. Marshals Service Northern District of Georgia Courthouse Locations
U.S. Marshals Service Southern District of Georgia Courthouse Locations

Georgia

Courthouses, federal